St. Mary's Parish is a Roman Catholic parish in Appleton, Wisconsin, USA, in the Diocese of Green Bay. 

Organized by Fr. J.N. Pfeiffer and the Irish Catholics of the area in 1859, St. Mary Parish was the first Roman Catholic church in Appleton. In 1860, a frame church was completed and dedicated to Mary, mother of Jesus under the title “St. Mary of the Seven Dolors”. U.S. Senator Joseph McCarthy is buried in the parish cemetery. Wisconsin State Assemblyman John Tracy and his family were attendees.

Notes

External links
St. Mary's Parish

Churches in Appleton, Wisconsin
Irish-American culture in Wisconsin
Churches in the Roman Catholic Diocese of Green Bay
Appleton